Mai Al-Kaila (born 8 April 1955) is a Palestinian doctor, diplomat and politician, and the first woman to hold the position of Health Minister of Palestine. She holds a PhD in public health and health administration. She chaired the Palestinian Medical Council in her capacity as Health Minister.

Background
Mai Salem Hanna al-Kaila was born in Jerusalem on 8 April 1955. She received her basic and preparatory education in the schools of Birzeit, and her secondary education at the Private College in Ramallah. She studied nursing at the Augusta Victoria Hospital in Jerusalem. She studied medicine at the University of Granada in Spain and obtained a bachelor's degree from it, then she specialized in the field of obstetrics and gynecology in the University of California, San Francisco in the United States of America and obtained a master's degree. She obtained her PhD in Public Health and Epidemiology from the University of Chile.

Career
Al-Kailah worked as a resident physician at the Palestine Red Crescent Hospital in Jerusalem in the Obstetrics and Gynecology program. Mai Al-Kailah has promoted jobs and positions, as she worked as a lecturer at Al-Quds University in the Public Health Department, and at UNRWA as head of the Motherhood and Childhood Program.

In 1994, Mai Al-Kailah was appointed to the Palestinian delegation to participate in the World Conference on Women, 1995 in Beijing, China.

Alkaila was appointed as the Ambassador of the State of Palestine to Chile on 31 October 2005. She continued to serve in that role until her appointment as Ambassador of the State of Palestine to Italy on 1 October 2013. On 4 December 2016, she won the Palestinian Revolutionary Council elections, which were held during the seventh conference of Fatah, and became a member in it.

On 13 April 2019, al-Kaila took the constitutional oath before Palestinian President Mahmoud Abbas as Minister of Health within Mohammad Shtayyeh's government.

Honors
 In 2017, Mai al-Keila was awarded a gold medal by the Norman Academy in cooperation with the Italian Air Force; this is due to her activism and defense of Palestinian human rights.

See also
Ministry of Health, Palestine

References

Living people
1955 births
People from Birzeit
Academic staff of Al-Quds University
Palestinian women academics
University of Chile alumni
University of Granada alumni
University of California, San Francisco alumni
Palestinian women nurses
Palestinian women physicians
Women government ministers of the Palestinian National Authority
Ambassadors of the State of Palestine to Italy
Ambassadors of the State of Palestine to Chile
Palestinian women ambassadors
Palestinian expatriates in Spain
Palestinian expatriates in the United States
Health Ministers of Palestine
21st-century Palestinian women politicians
20th-century Palestinian physicians
Recipients of Italian civil awards and decorations
21st-century Palestinian diplomats